Kirihata Dam is an earthfill dam located in Fukuoka Prefecture in Japan. The dam is used for irrigation. The catchment area of the dam is 2.2 km2. The dam impounds about 4  ha of land when full and can store 361 thousand cubic meters of water. The construction of the dam wascompleted in 1975.

References

Dams in Fukuoka Prefecture
1975 establishments in Japan